Dauphin River may refer to:

 Dauphin River, a river of Manitoba, Canada
 Dauphin River (Saint Lucia), a river of Saint Lucia
 Dauphin River, Manitoba, a community in the Canadian province of Manitoba
 Dauphin River First Nation, a First Nation in Manitoba

See also 
 Dauphin (disambiguation)